Robert Levi Windsor (28 November 1896 – 8 April 1988) was a businessman and member of the Queensland Legislative Assembly.

Biography
Windsor was born in the Central Queensland town of Mackay to parents Levi Windsor and his wife Mary (née Dunn). He went to school in Mackay and then the Brisbane Technical College where he learnt his trade as an engineer In World War I he was a stretcher bearer in the 15th Field Ambulance 5th Division from 1915 until 1919. He was gassed in 1917 and went AWOL in London in 1919. He joined the Volunteer Defence Corps in World War II for a year.

In 1926 he established RL Windsor & Son Pty Ltd, an engineering company now known as Fibre King and was the chairman of Condamine Oil Ltd from 1955 until 1957. His interests included tennis, swimming and motoring. Windsor was a Sunday School supervisor for 30 years and a member of the City Congregationalist Church.

On 20 October 1920 Windsor married Violet Newman. Violet died in 1938 and on 12 April 1941 he married Hazel Gladys Gordon. He had a total of 5 children including one boy and four girls. He died in April 1988 and was buried in the Toowong Cemetery.

Public career
Windsor, for the Liberal Party, won the seat of Fortitude Valley in the Queensland Legislative Assembly, beating the sitting member, Mick Brosnan in 1957. The seat was abolished before the 1960 state election and Windsor then contested and won the seat of Ithaca, holding it for six years until his retirement from politics.
 
In his time in parliament he never missed a sitting day, a record at the time. When campaigning, he would take a gramophone and a pile of records and play requests to attract and maintain a crowd. Although he was not a drinker, he used the Breakfast Creek Hotel as a meeting place during his campaign and visited it every day.

References

Members of the Queensland Legislative Assembly
1896 births
1988 deaths
Burials at Toowong Cemetery
Liberal Party of Australia members of the Parliament of Queensland
20th-century Australian politicians